St Mark's Church is a Church of England parish church in Forest Gate, east London.

History
It is sited on Lorne Road and originated as a mission church of Emmanuel Church. It was meant to serve the area between Wanstead Flats and the Romford Road and initially held services in a rented cowshed, until a site was acquired in 1888 for a permanent church, built in three stages between 1893 and 1898. This church was given a separate parish in 1894 by splitting off areas from Emmanuel and All Saints.

Present day
St Mark's stands in the evangelical tradition of the Church of England.

References

External links
 A Church Near You entry

1894 establishments in England
Mark's
19th-century Church of England church buildings
Conservative evangelical Anglican churches in England